George Kuksuk is a Canadian politician, who was elected to the Legislative Assembly of Nunavut in the 2013 election. He represented the electoral district of Arviat North-Whale Cove.

References

Living people
Members of the Executive Council of Nunavut
Members of the Legislative Assembly of Nunavut
Inuit from the Northwest Territories
Inuit politicians
Mayors of Arviat
21st-century Canadian politicians
Inuit from Nunavut
Year of birth missing (living people)
People from Arviat